John Charles Jones (3 May 1904 – 13 October 1956) was the Anglican Bishop of Bangor from 1943 until his death.

Jones was educated at the Grammar School, Carmarthen, Cardiff University and Wadham College, Oxford. He held curacies at Llanelli and Aberystwyth before 11 years of stay in Uganda as a Church Mission Society (CMS) missionary. He returned to Llanelli as its vicar in 1945, his last post before his ordination to the episcopate.

References

1904 births
Alumni of Cardiff University
Alumni of Wadham College, Oxford
Bishops of Bangor
20th-century bishops of the Church in Wales
1956 deaths